The 1832 United Kingdom general election, the first after the Reform Act, saw the Whigs win a large majority, with the Tories winning less than 30% of the vote.

Political situation
The Earl Grey had been Prime Minister since November 1830. He headed the first predominantly Whig administration since the Ministry of All the Talents in 1806–07.

In addition to the Whigs themselves, Grey was supported by Radical and other allied politicians. The Whigs and their allies were gradually coming to be referred to as liberals, but no formal Liberal Party had been established at the time of this election, so all the politicians supporting the ministry are referred to as Whig in the above results.

The Leader of the House of Commons since 1830 was Viscount Althorp (heir of the Earl Spencer), who also served as Chancellor of the Exchequer.

The last Tory prime minister, at the time of this election, was the Duke of Wellington. After leaving government office, Wellington continued to lead the Tory peers and was the overall Leader of the Opposition.

The Tory Leader of the Opposition in the House of Commons was Sir Robert Peel, Bt.

John Wilson Croker had used the term "conservative" in 1830, but the Tories at the time of this  election had not yet become generally known as the Conservative Party. This distinction would finally take hold after the Liberal Party was officially created.

In Irish politics, Daniel O'Connell was continuing his campaign for repeal of the Act of Union. He had founded the Irish Repeal Association and it presented candidates independent of the two principal parties.

Dates of election
Following the passage of the Reform Act 1832 and related legislation to reform the electoral system and redistribute constituencies, the tenth United Kingdom Parliament was dissolved on 3 December 1832. The new Parliament was summoned to meet on 29 January 1833, for a maximum seven-year term from that date. The maximum term could be and normally was curtailed, by the monarch dissolving the Parliament, before its term expired.

At this period there was not one election day. After receiving a writ (a royal command) for the election to be held, the local returning officer fixed the election timetable for the particular constituency or constituencies he was concerned with. Polling in seats with contested elections could continue for many days.

The general election took place between December 1832 and January 1833. The first nomination was on 8 December, with the first contest on 10 December and the last contest on 8 January 1833. It was usual for polling in the university constituencies and in Orkney and Shetland to take place about a week after other seats. Disregarding contests in the Universities and Orkney and Shetland, the last poll was on 1 January 1833.

Summary of the constituencies
For the distribution of constituencies in the unreformed House of Commons, before this  election, see the 1831 United Kingdom general election. Apart from the disenfranchisement of Grampound for corruption in 1821 and the transfer of its two seats as additional members for Yorkshire from 1826, there had been no change in the constituencies of England since the 1670s. In some cases the county and borough seats had remained unaltered since the 13th century. Welsh constituencies had been unchanged since the 16th century. Those in Scotland had remained the same since 1708 and in Ireland since 1801.

In 1832 politicians were facing an unfamiliar electoral map, as well as an electorate including those qualified under a new uniform householder franchise in the boroughs. However the reform legislation had not removed all the anomalies in the electoral system.

Table of largest and smallest electorates 1832–33, by country, type and number of seats

Monmouthshire (1 County constituency with 2 MPs and one single member Borough constituency) is included in Wales in these tables. Sources for this period may include the county in England.

Table 1: Constituencies and MPs, by type and country

Table 2: Number of seats per constituency, by type and country

Results

|}

Voting summary

Seats summary

Regional results

Great Britain

England

Scotland

Wales

Ireland

Universities

See also
 List of United Kingdom general elections
 List of MPs elected in the 1832 United Kingdom general election

References

External links
Spartacus: Political Parties and Election Results

 
1832 elections in the United Kingdom
General election
1832
December 1832 events
January 1833 events